Noice is a Swedish rock group from Gustavsberg formed in 1977. 

The band released their debut album Tonårsdrömmar in 1979 and had a major breakthrough when they performed two songs on the television show Måndagsbörsen in March 1980.

Noice scored successes at the same time as Gyllene Tider. Noice lost an Expressen vote between the two bands over which was the most popular.

The original line-up split in 1982, but the band have later reformed in various incarnations.

Original members

 Hasse Carlsson, vocals and guitar, born 19 of February 1965, died 4 September 2002
 Freddie Hansson, keyboard, born 22 of December 1963, died 29 December 2001
 Peo Thyrén, bass, born 17 October 1962
 Robert Klasen, drums, born 10 September 1962
 Robert Liman, guitar, born 15 May 1963 (left band in 1979)

Members year by year

1977–1979
Hasse Carlsson
Robert Liman
Peo Thyrén
Robert Klasen
Freddie Hansson,

1979–1980
Hasse Carlsson
Peo Thyrén
Robert Klasen
Freddie Hansson

1980–1982
Hasse Carlsson
Peo Thyrén
Fredrik von Gerber
Freddie Hansson

1982-1983
Nicklas Östergren
Peo Thyrén
Freddie Hansson
Kee Marcello

1991
Hasse Carlsson
Peo Thyrén
Fredrik von Gerber
Freddie Hansson,

1995–1996
Hasse Carlsson
Richard Evenlind
Peo Thyrén
Fredrik von Gerber
Frank Rönningen

2004–2005
Marcus Öhrn
Richard Evenlind
Peo Thyrén
Fredrik von Gerber
Johan Boding

2006
Marcus Öhrn
Peo Thyrén

2007–2008
Marcus Öhrn
Peo Thyrén
Andy Ravel 
Robert Klasen

2009–2014
Funky Dan Larsson
Peo Thyrén
Andy Ravel
Robert Klasen

2015-present
Funky Dan Larsson
Peo Thyrén
Jonas Karlberg
Robert Klasen

Discography

Studio albums
 Tonårsdrömmar (1979)
 Bedårande barn av sin tid (1980)
 Det ljuva livet (1981)
 Europa (1982)
 Vild, vild värld (1995)
 2004 (2004)

Live albums
 Live på Ritz (1982)
 Officiell Bootleg Live (2005) DVD
 Live 1979 + 1995 (2005)
 Nätter utan slut (2007) (Live Digital EP)

Albums
 H.I.T.S. (1989)
 Flashback 12 (1995)
 Svenska popfavoriter (1998)
 Noice Forever (2003)
 Samlat oljud (2003)
 17 klassiker (2007)
 Noice 4for1 (2012)

Singles
 "Television"/"Du e inte man" (1979)
 "En kväll i tunnelbanan"/"I natt e hela stan vår" (1980)
 "Du lever bara en gång"/"Amerikanska bilar" (1980)
 "Allting okey" (ny version)/"Bedårande barn av sin tid" (1981)
 "Everything's Alright"/"One Night in the Subway" (1981; single released in West Germany, Austria and Switzerland)
 "Vi rymmer bara du och jag"/"1987" (1981)
 "Dolce Vita (Det ljuva livet)"/"Romans för timmen" (1982)
 "Rött ljus, rött ljus"/"Ringer dig" (1982)
 "Du och jag"/"Noice on 45" (1982)
 "Vild, vild värld"/"En kväll i tunnelbanan"/"Vild, vild värld" (aucostic version) (1995)
 "Nätter utan slut" Digital Live EP (2007)

References

Swedish punk rock groups
1977 establishments in Sweden
1992 disestablishments in Sweden
Musical groups from Stockholm